Sultanhisar is a town and a small district of Aydın Province in the Aegean region of Turkey, 30 km east of the city of Aydın on the road to Denizli.

History 
The first settlement here was the ancient city of Nysa in Asia (on the Maeander), founded in the Hellenistic period and continuing to thrive under the Ancient Romans, also as bishopric, where the geographer Strabo was educated. Nysa is 3 km from the modern town of Sultanhisar, which was founded by the Seljuk Turks in 1270 and brought into the Ottoman Empire in 1425.

Geography and economy 
Sultanhisar is an agricultural district in the Büyük Menderes valley. The main products of the area are typical of the Aegean region: olives, figs, citrus fruits, grapes, strawberries etc. and the local industry is the processing of these products: olive oil pressing, spinning cotton, preparing and packing fruit, especially figs. Sultanhisar itself is a small town of 6,000 people on the İzmir-Afyon railway line. The local cuisine features typical Aegean dishes such as the bread-pancakes called gözleme. The town has a horticultural school of Adnan Menderes University.

Towns in the district 
 Atça - Well-planned and tidy, with 7,600 people a larger town than Sultanhisar itself. One of Turkey's largest strawberry growing districts. There is an annual strawberry harvest festival.
 Salavatlı -

Places of interest 
 Nysa on the Maeander - ruins of the ancient Carian city, including a large theatre, bridges (Nysa Bridge), baths and a gymnasium. The site is still being excavated, led by Professor Vedat Idil of Ankara University.

References

Sources and external links 
 
 local information 
 archaeology in Nysa 
 Sultanhisar information

Populated places in Aydın Province
Districts of Aydın Province
Sultanhisar District